Kishore Upadhyaya (born 1 June 1958) is an Indian politician and  Member of the Legislative Assembly representing Tehri in the Uttarakhand Legislative Assembly. He has been a member of the Bharatiya Janata Party since moving from the Indian National Congress in January 2022. He has been elected three times to represent Tehri, in 2002, 2007 and 2022. In 2012 Assembly election, he lost to Dinesh Dhanai an Independent candidate by 377 votes. He served as the Minister of state for Industrial Development under N. D. Tiwari from 2002 to 2004.

Kishore Upadhyaya was the President of Uttarakhand Pradesh Congress Committee from 2014 to 2017, taking over from Yashpal Arya.

Positions held

Elections contested

External links
 Amar Ujala

References

Living people
People from Tehri Garhwal district
Uttarakhand MLAs 2022–2027
Uttarakhand politicians
Indian National Congress politicians
1967 births